Turon, also known as Prospect, is an unincorporated community in Itawamba County, Mississippi, United States, located on Mississippi Highway 23 northeast of Smithville. A post office operated under the name Turon from 1897 to 1902.

References 

Unincorporated communities in Itawamba County, Mississippi
Unincorporated communities in Mississippi